Last of the Mobile Hot Shots is a 1970 American drama film. The screenplay by Gore Vidal is based on the Tennessee Williams play The Seven Descents of Myrtle, which opened on Broadway in March 1968 and ran for 29 performances.

Sidney Lumet directed Lynn Redgrave as Myrtle, James Coburn as Jeb, and Robert Hooks as Chicken. The film was shot in New Orleans and St. Francisville, Louisiana. It was released by the title Blood Kin in Europe.

Plot
In New Orleans, Myrtle Kane and Jeb Stuart Thorington, arrive on The Rube Benedict Show where the eponymous host selects them and another couple as contestants. Despite not knowing each other, the couple wins the competition, and decides to earn $3,500 on one condition, to have their marriage ordained by a minister on set. Using the check to restore Waverley Plantation, the couple arrives there, about 100 miles upstream from New Orleans, where Jeb introduces his wife to the decaying plantation mansion his family has owned since 1840. Sometime later, Jeb introduces Myrtle to his multiracial half-brother, Chicken (Robert Hooks) – on his father's side – who'd earned his nickname for hoarding chickens to the rooftop during childhood. Myrtle eventually shares her background in show business, as the last surviving member of an Alabama female quintet, named the Mobile Hot-Shots.

After Myrtle steps out, Jeb and Chicken engage in an argument, where Jeb states his ownership over the mansion, while Chicken states that when Jeb succumbs to terminal lung cancer, he will become the new owner as he is next of kin. Then, Jeb reveals to Myrtle, in a flashback, that he was discharged from the army, he engages in a "war" with Chicken, ordering his half-brother to leave the mansion, though Chicken would return to sign an agreement, making him next subsequent owner.

On her way to dinner, Myrtle grows an immediate dislike for her brother-in-law, though Jeb orders Myrtle to retrieve the agreement from Chicken's wallet in his back pocket. However, she is unsuccessful in her attempts, until Jeb orders his wife to kill Chicken with a hammer, and never to return upstairs without the document. When Myrtle goes downstairs once more, she engages in a conversation until she ultimately reveals, she'd never married Jeb. Chicken refuses to believe it, and orders her to retrieve her marriage license. Myrtle returns upstairs, angering Jeb for not retrieving the agreement, before returning downstairs to present Chicken the marriage license.

After showing the marriage license, Myrtle engages in an extramarital affair, with Chicken. Meanwhile, Jeb, who experiences several flashbacks of his mother, and multiple threesome affairs with several prostitutes, becomes angered that his wife has not returned with the document, and marches downstairs armed with a pistol, where he ultimately burns the agreement. After burning the agreement, Chicken reveals that he is actually the plantation's heir, through his mother rather than the "mistake" produced from an interracial extramarital affair committed by Jeb's father, who later died in World War II. Learning of the revelation, Jeb collapses to the floor, and dies.

Finally, the levee breaks, forcing Chicken and Myrtle to ascend to the rooftop, to escape the surrounding floodwaters, for refuge and sexual fulfillment.

Cast 
 James Coburn as Jeb Stuart Thorington
 Lynn Redgrave as Myrtle Kane
 Robert Hooks as Chicken
 Perry Hayes as George 
 Reggie King  as Rube Benedict

Production
Coburn said “I thought it would be a wonderful film. After all, James Wong Howe shot it. Gore Vidal wrote the script, Sidney Lumet was the director and we had a good budget. But, somewhere along the way the focus got lost It didn’t work as a film. When Sidney makes his mind up about something, he’ll go with it, good or bad, right or wrong, he’ll go with it. Unfortunately, he was wrong on that film."

Reception
Vincent Canby, writing for The New York Times, reviewed the film as a "slapstick tragicomedy that looks and sounds and plays very much like cruel parody—of Tennessee Williams", and he further remarked that the film "is haunted by ghosts of earlier, more memorable Williams characters who are easily identifiable even though there have been some changes in sex and color."

See also
 List of American films of 1970

References

External links
 
 
 

1970 films
1970 comedy-drama films
American comedy-drama films
American films based on plays
1970s English-language films
Films directed by Sidney Lumet
Films scored by Quincy Jones
Films set in Louisiana
Films shot in Louisiana
Films shot in New Orleans
Films with screenplays by Gore Vidal
Warner Bros. films
1970s American films